Otilia Lux de Cotí is a Guatemalan social leader and politician. 

She was a member of that country's Historical Clarification Commission, charged with investigating the human rights violations committed during the Central American nation's 30-year-long civil war. She was later chosen to serve as Minister of Culture and Sport in the cabinet of President Alfonso Portillo. She was a member of the United Nations Permanent Forum on Indigenous Issues at the United Nations, and she served on UNESCO's Executive Board for the 2004–2007 period.

In the 9 September 2007 general election, she was elected to Congress as a national list deputy for the Encuentro por Guatemala party.

External links
Otilia Lux – Profile

Members of the Congress of Guatemala
Guatemalan people of Maya descent 
Year of birth missing (living people)
Living people
Government ministers of Guatemala
Encuentro por Guatemala politicians
Women government ministers of Guatemala
21st-century Guatemalan women politicians
21st-century Guatemalan politicians
Social leaders